Alfred Leonhard Maluma (12 December 1955 – 6 April 2021) was a Tanzanian Roman Catholic bishop.

Ordained to the priesthood on 17 November 1985, Maluma was named bishop of the Roman Catholic Diocese of Njombe, Tanzania in 2002.

He died on 6 April 2021 at the Muhimbili National Referral Hospital.

References 

1955 births
2021 deaths
21st-century Roman Catholic bishops in Tanzania
Place of birth missing
Roman Catholic bishops of Njombe
Tanzanian Roman Catholic bishops